Satellite City is a Welsh sitcom which started out originally as a radio show on BBC Radio Wales in 1994 and then evolved into a TV version made by BBC Wales and was first broadcast in 1996.

The setting was an imaginary small town in the South Wales Valleys. The plot centered on the arrival of Randy (Michael Neill), an American visitor, who was taken in by the Price family (but had to share a bed with pensioner Idris, played by Islwyn Morris). Randy soon formed a relationship with local girl Mandy (Shelley Miranda Barrett). The other main characters were Idris's son, Gwynne (played by Boyd Clack, who also co-wrote the series), Gwynne's wife Moira (Ri Richards), barman Dai (Rhodri Hugh), and Mandy's friend Bridget (Einir Sion), replaced in the final series by the character of Donna (Kirsten Clark). In the final episode Randy moved into his own house with Mandy. There are continual references to Idris's ferret Sylvester (his beloved pet), and he eventually discovers that it is, in fact, a girl ferret.

The reason for the title is explained in the first episode: the district had been used for the initial testing of satellite dishes, but when the time came to return the dishes or pay for the service, no one returned them and no one paid.  Satellite City thus suggests a run-down area.

In 1999 the series won a BAFTA Cymru Award for Best Light Entertainment.

A pilot, eighteen 30-minute episodes and a one-hour special were made in all. The pilot was significantly different from the remainder of the series, portraying Idris as senile and deluded into believing that clothes pegs are talking to him.

Cast
 Michael Neill as Randy 
 Islwyn Morris as Idris
 Shelley Miranda Barrett as Mandy
 Boyd Clack as Gwynne
 Ri Richards as Moira
 Rhodri Hugh as Dai
 Einir Sion as Bridget
  Kirsten Clark as Donna
 Brian Hibbard As Spike

Episodes

Pilot (1995)

Series 1 (1996)

Series 2 (1997–98)

Series 3 (1998–99)

References

External links 
 Satellite City BBC programme page
 

BBC television sitcoms
BBC Cymru Wales television shows
Welsh television shows
1995 British television series debuts
Television shows set in Wales
1990s Welsh television series
1999 British television series endings
1990s British sitcoms